Al Ain Zoo, also "Al Ain Wildlife Park & Resort" or simply "Al Ain Wildlife Park", is a  zoo located in the foothills of Jebel Hafeet in Al Ain, Abu Dhabi, the United Arab Emirates. It is primarily composed of ungulates and herbivores such as Arabian antelopes and oryx, eland, gazelle, lechwe and can be found in the tree shaded paddocks which offer breeding conditions that were deemed 'excellent'. Like the Breeding Centre for Endangered Wildlife in the Emirate of Sharjah, which is now closed to the public, it is a member of the EAZA.

The Al Ain Zoo hosts the rare white lion and Nubian giraffe.

History and fauna

The zoo was founded in 1968 by Sheikh Zayed bin Sultan Al Nahyan, the late Ruler of Abu Dhabi and President of the United Arab Emirates, out of concern for the land's wildlife, particularly ungulates such as the Arabian oryx.

The zoo features a big cat house. Lions, mountain lions, jaguars, black panther and spotted leopards are found here. In addition to this, it also has a reptile house, monkey compounds, aquarium, and aviary. From February 2010 until July 2010, the Al Ain Zoo hosted the "Dinosaur Trail", a small section which includes around 15 to 20 mechanical dinosaurs with sensors such as Tyrannosaurus rex, as well as information about the dinosaur such as when they lived, which parts of the (current) world they would have been found, and their height and diet, for example.

In April 2019, the zoo was preparing to expand with work on its perimeters going on at the moment in order to build new sites such as the conservation and breeding centre, African Safari, World Desert Zoo, and the Sheikh Zayed Desert Learning Centre.

The zoo is taking all possible steps to conserve the Rhinoceroses, which are an endangered species on the International Union for Conservation of Nature (IUCN) Red List by following the international global breeding practices and raising awareness of the importance of wildlife conservation.

The zoo has implemented a series of initiatives to acquire and exchange a number of animals with Dubai Safari Park. The initiative includes the exchange of Rhinoceroses, Arabian Sand Cats, Blue Wildebeests and a number of reptile species, which have been transferred as part of breeding plans and to enhance the variety of species at both zoos.

Gallery

See also
 Al Hefaiyah Conservation Centre
 Dubai Dolphinarium
 Dubai Safari Park
 Dubai Zoo
 Emirates Park Zoo near Abu Dhabi City
 Sir Bani Yas in the Western Region

References

External links
 
 

1969 establishments in the Trucial States
Zoos in the United Arab Emirates
Zoo
Zoo
Zoos established in 1969